Fort Bend Christian Academy (FBCA) is a private PK-12 Christian school with two campuses in Sugar Land, Texas in the Houston metropolitan area. The North Campus houses high school while the South Campus houses elementary and middle school.

History

The school first opened in September 1987, with seven kindergarten students, as Sugar Creek Baptist Church School (SCBCS). The school, on the property of Sugar Creek Baptist Church, had one teacher in its initial year, and 1988 it had 14 students with first grade included. The school moved to the property of the First Baptist Church of Sugar Land and changed its name to Fort Bend Baptist Academy (FBBA) in Summer 1992. At the time of the move the school became non-denominational and it was no longer affiliated and no longer received support from the church. The word "Baptist" remained in its name even though it became a non-denominational school with no support from any particular denomination.

The 7th and 8th grades opened in the 1993–1994 school year. In the following year the FBBA's high school division opened.

Its current name was adopted in the summer of 2011. The board adopted a name indicating the school's non-denominational status in order to compete with area private schools and increase enrollment. The school mascot, colors, and scripture verse remained the same. The school hired a marketing company to establish a new brand along with the new name.

References

External links
 Fort Bend Christian Academy

Schools in Sugar Land, Texas
High schools in Fort Bend County, Texas
Private K-12 schools in Texas
1987 establishments in Texas
Educational institutions established in 1987
Christian schools in Houston
Baptist schools in the United States
Private schools in Greater Houston